Ed Stein may refer to:

 Ed Stein (baseball) (1869–1928), Major League Baseball player
 Ed Stein (footballer), South African-born English former football player and coach
 Ed Stein (cartoonist) (born 1946), American cartoonist and former editorial cartoonist